The Palms Ground was a football ground in the Florentin neighborhood of Tel Aviv, Israel. The ground was first known as Maccabi Ground and later as Hapoel Ground, but was nicknamed Palms Ground after the palms surrounding it.

History
The ground was built in the early 1920s for use of Maccabi Tel Aviv, which played in the ground until its lease was over and the club built a new ground in south-east Tel Aviv. In 1929 Hapoel Tel Aviv, recently merged with Allenby football club, moved to play at the ground. However, due to security concerns, arising from the proximity of the ground to Jaffa, Hapoel moved to a new ground in 1941, after which the ground was abandoned and was built over.

Notable matches
 In 1923 hosted the first Cup competition for Jewish football team, the Magen Shimshon, in which Maccabi Nes Tziona had beaten Maccabi Haifa 2–0. 
 In January 1924 the visiting Hakoah Vienna played its first match in Palestine, winning over a Maccabi Tel Aviv 5–1.  A year later, Hakoah made a second visit to Palestine, this time beating Maccabi 11–2.
 The ground hosted the Palestine Cup finals in 1930, in which Maccabi Tel Aviv had beaten a Northamptonshire Regiment XI 2–1.
 In 1934, the national team hosted its first ever home match on the ground, losing 1–4 against Egypt.

See also
Sports in Israel

References

 

Defunct football venues in Israel
Maccabi Tel Aviv F.C.
Hapoel Tel Aviv F.C.
Sports venues in Tel Aviv